The Advisory Board Company was a consulting firm focusing on health care organizations and educational institutions. It began in 1979 in Washington, DC. Its educational business was spun off and the remaining company was acquired by Optum in 2017.

History
The company was founded by David G. Bradley in 1979 as the Research Council of Washington. Its original mission was to answer "any question for any company for any industry," but in 1983 the company began to specialize in research for the financial services industry and changed its name to The Advisory Board Company. By 1986, the company had launched its health care-focused strategic research division, including its first membership program, the Health Care Advisory Board. Across the next four years the firm grew to 150 employees, served more than 500 health care members, and published 15 major reports and 2,000 research briefs each year.

In 1993, the firm launched a strategic research membership for large companies, bringing on almost half of the Fortune 500 within 18 months. The firm expanded in 1994 to include its first clinically based program, the Cardiology Roundtable, later the Cardiovascular Roundtable.

In 1997, the company spun off its corporate membership group, forming The Corporate Executive Board (later CEB Inc.) as an independent company. It maintained its focus on the health care sector, working with more than 1,500 health care organizations. H*Works, a consulting business offering best practice implementation support, launched in 2000.

The Advisory Board Company filed an initial public offering in 2001, in which Bradley sold his ownership interest.

By 2002, the firm topped 2,100 memberships and 500 employees, and launched The Advisory Board Academies leadership development division (later the company's Talent Development division) to address leadership in health care.

In 2003 the Advisory Board Company launched Compass, offering business intelligence and analytics.

In 2007, the company launched its first membership programs in higher education, working with student and academic affairs executives at several U.S. research universities. It formed an education division, the Education Advisory Board.

In 2008 it acquired Crimson, a data, analytics, and business intelligence software provider focused on physician performance, quality metrics, and cost of care outcomes. By 2009, The Advisory Board Company expanded to San Francisco, its fourth U.S. office. The firm grew to over 1,000 employees and over 2,800 health care and higher education members. That year the firm acquired Southwind, a health care industry management and consulting firm.

From 2010 to 2011, the company continued to expand, acquiring and partnering with a series of technology firms, including Milliman MedInsight, which provides population risk analytics; Cielo MedSolutions, which provides ambulatory patient registry software; and PivotHealth, a physician practice management firm.

In 2012, The Advisory Board Company acquired ActiveStrategy, a performance improvement technology firm, and 360Fresh, a leading provider of clinical data analytics. During that year, the firm also provided $1 million in benefit to non-profit organizations through its Community Impact program.

That year, the advisory board acquired Care Team Connect, a care management workflow platform, and launched the Student Success Collaborative, a software-based program that helps colleges and universities improve outcomes for at-risk and off-path students. The company also announced the acquisition of Medical Referral Source, a technology firm with software that facilitates a seamless referral process.

2014 brought the acquisitions of health care software firm HealthPost, and the higher education consulting firm Royall & Company.

The Advisory Board Company partnered with the de Beaumont Foundation, Kresge Foundation, and Robert Wood Johnson Foundation to launch the BUILD Health Challenge to identify and support health partnerships that were improving health in low-income, urban communities.

In 2015, the firm acquired Clinovations, a health care information technology firm, and GradesFirst, a software company that helped colleges and universities to identify and to support at-risk students. As of 2016, the company had grown to more than 3,600 employees, with offices on three continents.

In January 2017, the company reduced its healthcare workforce by 220 employees, or 5.7%, exited several businesses and announced a plan to close four offices by the end of 2017.

On August 29, 2017, the company sold and split off its two business units. The health care business was acquired by Optum, a global health company. On November 17, 2017, its education division, now EAB, announced that it would be established as an independent entity, separate from The Advisory Board Company.  That business was acquired by Vista Equity Partners, a leading investment firm. The total value of the deal was roughly $2.5B. CEB, which had been spun out in 1997, had been acquired by Gartner in April 2017.

Awards
In 2005, the Advisory Board Company was named to Forbes’ Top 200 High-Growth Companies and to Washingtonian magazine's Great Places to Work in 2003 and 2005. The company was named to Modern Healthcare’s Best Places to Work.

In 2012, the firm was named as one of "top 100 health care IT firms" by Healthcare Informatics and Modern Healthcare magazine's top 40 fastest-growing health care firms list. In 2013, the Advisory Board Company was named the “#1 Best Large Company to Work For" by Modern Healthcare. It also became the first for-profit company of its size to achieve 100% participation in community service.

The company's Community Impact program received the 2014 Corporate Engagement Award of Excellence from Points of Light, the world's largest organization dedicated to volunteer service.

In 2016 it was named as a Modern Healthcare Best Place to Work for the eighth straight year.

Notable current and former employees
Jeffrey Zients, White House COVID Coordinator; Former Director of the White House Office of Management and Budget
David Bradley, Owner of the Atlantic Media Company 
Aneesh Chopra, Former Chief Technology Officer of the United States
Lisa Monaco, Assistant Attorney General

References

External links

Companies formerly listed on the Nasdaq
Companies based in Washington, D.C.
Consulting firms established in 1979
1979 establishments in Washington, D.C.
Consulting firms of the United States
2017 mergers and acquisitions
Consulting firms disestablished in 2017
2017 disestablishments in Washington, D.C.
2001 initial public offerings